The Upper Granite Canyon Patrol Cabin was built by the Civilian Conservation Corps about 1935.  The log structure is located in the extreme southwest backcountry of Grand Teton National Park. The cabin was built according to a standard design for such structures, in the National Park Service Rustic style. The Moran Bay Patrol Cabin is similar.

The patrol cabin is a one-story log cabin on a log sill foundation using  logs. The cabin is square in plan with asphalt roll roofing on the gabled roof. The door retains its original wrought iron hardware. The interior logs are trimmed with split-pole chinking. The ceiling is open, with exposed log framing.

The Upper Granite Canyon Patrol Cabin was placed on the National Register of Historic Places on August 19, 1998.

See also
 Historical buildings and structures of Grand Teton National Park

References

External links

Upper Granite Canyon Patrol Cabin at the Wyoming State Historic Preservation Office

Buildings and structures in Grand Teton National Park
Log cabins in the United States
Civilian Conservation Corps in Wyoming
National Register of Historic Places in Grand Teton National Park
Log buildings and structures on the National Register of Historic Places in Wyoming
1935 establishments in Wyoming
National Park Service rustic in Wyoming